L. leucocephala may refer to:
 Leucaena leucocephala, the white leadtree jumbay or white popinac, a small tropical tree species
 Lomandra leucocephala, a plant species in the genus Lomandra found in New South Wales, Australia

See also
 Leucocephala (disambiguation)